Hanna Victorivna Knyazyeva-Minenko (born 25 September 1989) is a former Ukrainian and a current Israeli triple jumper and long jumper.

She established a personal best in August 2015 of 14.78 meters (m) in the triple jump while winning the silver medal at the 2015 World Championships in Athletics. She competed for her native Ukraine at the 2012 Summer Olympics in the women’s triple jump event, coming in fourth with a jump of 14.56 m.

She immigrated to Israel and became an Israeli citizen in early 2013 on account of marriage to an Israeli citizen, and has represented Israel since then.  At the 77th Israeli Athletics Championships in early July 2013, Knyazyeva-Minenko established a new Israeli record in winning the women's triple jump with a distance of 14.50 m.  At the Sainsbury's Anniversary Games Diamond League competition in London later that month, she won a bronze medal with a distance of 14.29 m in the triple jump. In September 2013 at the International Association of Athletics Federations (IAAF) World Challenge in Zagreb, Croatia, she jumped 14.38 m and won a silver medal in the triple jump.

At the 78th Israel national championships in 2014, Knyazyeva-Minenko won a gold medal in the long jump while setting a new Israeli record and personal best with a distance of 6.52 m. She won a bronze medal in the triple jump at the European Athletics Indoor Championships in Prague in March 2015, becoming the first Israeli woman to win a track and field medal at a major European championship. She jumped a distance of 14.49 m, setting a new Israeli national indoor record. Competing for Israel at the 2015 European Games in June 2015, she won the triple jump competition that formed part of the Athletics event at the 2015 European Games, though no individual medal was awarded to her as the competition was a team event only; she also won a bronze medal for the team event. Representing Israel at the 2015 World Championships in Athletics in Beijing, China, in August 2015, she won the silver medal in the triple jump, setting a new Israeli record of 14.78 meters. Knyazyeva-Minenko represented Israel at the 2016 Summer Olympics in the triple jump, coming in fifth.

Early and personal life
Anna Victorivna Knyazyeva (Анна Вікторівна Князєва) was born in Pereiaslav-Khmelnytskyi, Ukrainian SSR, to a Christian family. She began training as an athlete when she was eight years old.

She married Soviet Kazakh-born Israeli former decathlon champion Anatoly Minenko, whom she had met in a training camp, in November 2012. They reside in Israel.

Athletic career

For Ukraine
Knyazyeva won the silver medal in the triple jump at the 2007 European Athletics Junior Championships.  On 10 July 2008, she came in 4th in the triple jump at the 12th IAAF World Junior Championships in Athletics in Bydgoszcz, Poland, with a distance of 13.61 m.  She established a personal best in June 2012 of 14.71 m in the triple jump, 79 centimeters short of the world record, when she was 22 years old.

Knyazyeva placed fourth for Ukraine in the women’s triple jump event at the 2012 Summer Olympics, with a best jump of 14.56 meters. She trailed Olga Rypakova of Kazakhstan, Caterine Ibargüen of Colombia, and Olha Saladukha of Ukraine.

For Israel
Knyazyeva-Minenko immigrated to Israel and became an Israeli citizen, on account of marriage to an Israeli citizen.  Her coach is Israeli Alex Merman, who formerly coached Israeli high jumper Konstantin Matusevich, and her club is Maccabi Tel Aviv.

At the 77th Israeli Athletics Championships in early July 2013, she established a new Israeli record in winning the women’s triple jump with a distance of 14.50 m. Knyazyeva-Minenko won a silver medal at the 2013 IAAF Diamond League competition in Paris, jumping 14.58 m in the triple jump.  At the Sainsbury's Anniversary Games Diamond League competition in London on 26 July 2013, she won a bronze medal in the triple jump with a distance of 14.29 m, behind Jamaican Kimberly Williams and Russian Ekaterina Koneva.

At the 14th IAAF World Championships in Athletics at Luzhniki Stadium in Moscow on 15 August 2013, at age 23 in her first major event representing Israel, Knyazyeva-Minenko came in 6th in the triple jump, with a distance of 14.33 m, after posting a 14.46 m and coming in third in the qualifying round.  She was the first Israeli to reach a World Championships final since Israeli Alex Averbukh in the pole vault, in 2007.  She observed: "I'm still young, and I’ve got many more years to represent [Israel] and bring it honor."

On 3 September 2013 at the International Association of Athletics Federations (IAAF) World Challenge in Zagreb, Croatia, she jumped 14.38 m in the triple jump and won a silver medal, behind winner Olha Saladuha of Ukraine. In 2013, she held a women's triple jump ranking of No. 4 in the Diamond League series.

In 2014 Knyazyeva-Minenko had an operation to repair an injured Achilles tendon, and missed competing for most of the year as a result.  However, at the 78th Israel national championships at Hadar Yosef Stadium in Tel Aviv in 2014, she won a gold medal in the long jump while setting a new Israeli record with a distance of 6.52 m.  The distance was a new personal best for the event, and eclipsed by six centimeters Sigal Gonen’s previous Israeli record, which had stood for 28 years since 1986.

Knyazyeva-Minenko won a bronze medal at the European Athletics Indoor Championships in Prague in March 2015, competing for Israel in the triple jump. She jumped a distance of 14.49 meters (47.5 feet), setting a new Israeli national indoor record for the second day in a row, improving on her prior day's national record jump in the qualifiers by nine centimeters. In winning the medal, she became the first Israeli woman to win a track and field medal at a major European championship, and became the first Israeli to win a medal at the European Indoor Championships since Alex Averbukh won a gold medal in the pole vault at the 2000 European Indoor Championships.  She noted: "My best jump (14.49 meters) would have won me the gold medal at the last World Championship." Russia's Ekaterina Koneva won the gold medal, and Bulgaria's Gabriela Petrova won the silver medal.

At the IAAF Diamond League Bislett Games in Oslo, Norway, on 11 June 2015 she came in fifth in the triple jump, at 14.22 m. Competing for Israel at the 2015 European Games on 21 June 2015, she won the triple jump portion of the Team Athletics event with a distance of 14.41 m; she also won a bronze medal for the team event.

She represented Israel at the 2015 World Championships in Athletics in Beijing, China, in August 2015.  She won the silver medal in the triple jump, setting a new Israeli record of 14.78 meters.

Knyazyeva-Minenko represented Israel at the 2016 Summer Olympics in the triple jump, at the age of 26. She jumped 14.68 m in the final, for fifth place, six centimeters behind the bronze medalist. Her fifth-place finish matched the best-ever finish for an Israeli in an Olympic athletics competition, established first by high jumper Konstantin Matusevich, at the 2000 Olympics.

Competition record

See also
List of Israeli records in athletics

References

External links

 
 
 

1989 births
Living people
Israeli female long jumpers
Israeli female triple jumpers
Olympic athletes of Ukraine
Athletes (track and field) at the 2012 Summer Olympics
Athletes (track and field) at the 2016 Summer Olympics
Ukrainian female long jumpers
Ukrainian female triple jumpers
People from Pereiaslav
Ukrainian emigrants to Israel
Naturalized citizens of Israel
World Athletics Championships athletes for Israel
World Athletics Championships medalists
European Games bronze medalists for Israel
Athletes (track and field) at the 2015 European Games
European Games medalists in athletics
European Athletics Championships medalists
Olympic athletes of Israel
Ukrainian people of Israeli descent
Competitors at the 2011 Summer Universiade
Athletes (track and field) at the 2020 Summer Olympics
Sportspeople from Kyiv Oblast